Gunterichthys is a genus of viviparous brotula.

Species
There are currently three recognized species in this genus:
 Gunterichthys bussingi Møller, Schwarzhans & J. G. Nielsen, 2004 (Bussing's mudbrotula)
 Gunterichthys coheni Møller, Schwarzhans & J. G. Nielsen, 2004 (Cohen's mudbrotula)
 Gunterichthys longipenis C. E. Dawson, 1966 (Gold brotula)

References

Bythitidae
Ray-finned fish genera
Taxa named by Charles Eric Dawson